Amilo is a village in Pindra Tehsil of Varanasi district in the Indian state of Uttar Pradesh. Amilo falls under Dhananjaypur gram panchayat. The village is about 37 kilometers North-West of Varanasi city, 279 kilometers South-East of state capital Lucknow and 786 kilometers South-East of the national capital Delhi.

Demography
Amilo has a total population of 135 people amongst 16 families. Sex ratio of Amilo is 1,500 and child sex ratio is 3,167. Uttar Pradesh state average for both ratios is 912 and 902 respectively .

Transportation
Amilo can be accessed by road but does not have a railway station of its own. Nearest operational airports are Varanasi airport (24 kilometers East) and Allahabad Airports (124 kilometers West).

See also

Pindra Tehsil
Pindra (Assembly constituency)

Notes
  All demographic data is based on 2011 Census of India.

References 

Villages in Varanasi district